Menelaos Kokkinakis (born ) is a Greek male volleyball player. He is part of the Greece men's national volleyball team. On club level he plays for PAOK.

Honours

 Greek Championship (3)
 2011, 2013, 2014
 Greek Cup (6)
 2011, 2013, 2014, 2016, 2017, 2022
 Greek League Cup (4)
 2013, 2015, 2016, 2017

References

External links
 profile at FIVB.org
 profile, club career, info at greekvolley.gr 

1993 births
Living people
Greek men's volleyball players
Olympiacos S.C. players
Volleyball players from Athens